Vikingarna (Swedish for the Vikings) may refer to:

 Vikingarna (band), a Swedish dansband
 Vikingarnas FK, a Swedish soccer club
 Vikingarnas IF, a Swedish sports club